Yassan Ouatching (born 28 November 1998) is a professional footballer who plays as a striker for Hearts of Oak. Born in Cameroon, he is a Central African Republic international.

Career

In 2019, Ouatching signed for Burmese side Zwekapin United. In 2021, he signed for Mohammedan (Dhaka) in Bangladesh. In 2022, he signed for Ghanaian club Hearts of Oak.

References

External links

 

1998 births
Accra Hearts of Oak S.C. players
Association football forwards
Bangladesh Football Premier League players
Cameroonian expatriate footballers
Cameroonian expatriate sportspeople in Ghana
Cameroonian footballers
Cameroonian people of Central African Republic descent
Central African Republic expatriate footballers
Central African Republic footballers
Central African Republic international footballers
Elite One players
Expatriate footballers in Bangladesh
Expatriate footballers in Ghana
Expatriate footballers in Myanmar
Living people
Mohammedan SC (Dhaka) players
Myanmar National League players
Zwegabin United F.C. players